"A Song Is Born" was a collaboration between Ayumi Hamasaki and Keiko (Globe) for the Song Nation non-profit project by Avex, which was created to raise funds to help the victims of the 9/11 attacks on the World Trade Center. The song was composed by Tetsuya Komuro, but unlike the other two single releases of the project, "The Meaning of Peace" (a duet between BoA and Kumi Koda) and "Lovin' It" (a duet between Namie Amuro and Verbal of M-Flo), the lyrics were written by Ayumi Hamasaki. Hamasaki went on to record a solo version on this song, which appeared on her fourth studio album, I am....

Track listing
"A Song Is Born" (Original Mix)
"A Song Is Born" (TV Mix)

Charts
Oricon Sales Chart (Japan)

References

2001 singles
Ayumi Hamasaki songs
Oricon Weekly number-one singles
Female vocal duets
Songs written by Ayumi Hamasaki
Song recordings produced by Tetsuya Komuro
Songs written by Tetsuya Komuro
2001 songs
Avex Trax singles